The men's triple jump competition at the 2004 Summer Olympics in Athens was held at the Olympic Stadium on 20–22 August. Forty-seven athletes from 35 nations competed. The event was won by Christian Olsson of Sweden, the nation's first victory in the event since 1948 and third overall. Marian Oprea won Romania's first men's triple jump medal with his silver. Russia earned bronze for the second consecutive Games, this time with Danil Burkenya taking the medal.

Background

This was the 25th appearance of the event, which is one of 12 athletics events to have been held at every Summer Olympics. The returning finalists from the 2000 Games were fourth-place finisher Yoelbi Quesada of Cuba, sixth-place finisher Phillips Idowu of Great Britain, tenth-place finisher Andrew Murphy of Australia, eleventh-place finisher Walter Davis of the United States, and twelfth-place finisher Charles Friedek of Germany. Christian Olsson of Sweden was the reigning (2003) world champion and had also finished second in 2001; he was the favorite.

Belarus, Burkina Faso, Estonia, Grenada, Moldova, Qatar, Slovenia, Syria, and Trinidad and Tobago each made their first appearance in the event. The United States competed for the 24th time, having missed only the boycotted 1980 Games.

Qualification

The qualification period for Athletics was 1 January 2003 to 9 August 2004. For the men's triple jump, each National Olympic Committee was permitted to enter up to three athletes that had jumped 16.95 metres or further during the qualification period. The maximum number of athletes per nation had been set at 3 since the 1930 Olympic Congress. If an NOC had no athletes that qualified under that standard, one athlete that had jumped 16.55 metres or further could be entered.

Competition format

The competition consisted of two rounds, qualification and final. In qualification, each athlete jumped three times (stopping early if they made the qualifying distance). At least the top twelve athletes moved on to the final; if more than twelve reached the qualifying distance, all who did so advanced. Distances were reset for the final round. Finalists jumped three times, after which the eight best jumped three more times (with the best distance of the six jumps counted).

Records

, the existing world and Olympic records were as follows.

No new world or Olympic records were set during the competition. The following national records were set during the competition:

Schedule

All times are Greece Standard Time (UTC+2)

Results

Qualifying

Rule: Qualifying standard 17.00 (Q) or at least best 12 qualified (q).

Final

References

External links
Official Olympic Report

M
Triple jump at the Olympics
Men's events at the 2004 Summer Olympics